This list of birds of California is a comprehensive listing of all the bird species seen naturally in the U.S. state of California as determined by the California Bird Records Committee (CBRC).

As of August 5, 2022, there are 681 species on the CBRC list. Two of these species are endemic, 13 were introduced by humans (directly or indirectly), one species has been extirpated, and one was extirpated in the wild but its reintroduction is in progress. Five additional species have been documented but "the CBRC could not reach a consensus as to whether records of these species involved true naturally occurring vagrants or escapes from captivity." 

The following tags note species in each of those categories and one additional category:

(En) Endemic to California
(I) Introduced but now established in California
(Ex) Extirpated from California 
(RI) Reintroduction in progress - not yet established 
(*) California Bird Records Committee Review Species (200 species; in general, review species average four or fewer occurrences per year in California over the most recent ten-year period.) 
(UO) Of unknown origin

Individuals or even flocks of many additional species have been recorded in California but these birds are assumed to be deliberately released or escaped from captivity. In the absence of evidence of wild origin, they are not included in the CBRC list.

This list is presented in the taxonomic sequence of the Check-list of North and Middle American Birds, 7th edition through the 623rd Supplement, published by the American Ornithological Society (AOS). Common and scientific names are also those of the Check-list, except that the common names of families are from the Clements taxonomy because the AOS list does not include them.

Ducks, geese, and waterfowl
Order: AnseriformesFamily: Anatidae

The family Anatidae includes the ducks and most duck-like waterfowl, such as geese and swans. These birds are adapted to an aquatic existence with webbed feet, bills which are flattened to a greater or lesser extent, and feathers that are excellent at shedding water due to special oils.

 Black-bellied whistling-duck, Dendrocygna autumnalis (*)
 Fulvous whistling-duck, Dendrocygna bicolor (*)
 Emperor goose, Anser canagica (*)
 Snow goose, Anser caerulescens
 Ross's goose, Anser rossii
 Greater white-fronted goose, Anser albifrons
 Tundra bean-goose, Anser serrirostris (*)
 Brant, Branta bernicla
 Cackling goose, Branta hutchinsii
 Canada goose, Branta canadensis
 Trumpeter swan, Cygnus buccinator
 Tundra swan, Cygnus columbianus
 Whooper swan, Cygnus cygnus (*)
 Wood duck, Aix sponsa
 Baikal teal, Sibirionetta formosa (*)
 Garganey, Spatula querquedula (*)
 Blue-winged teal, Spatula discors
 Cinnamon teal, Spatula cyanoptera
 Northern shoveler, Spatula clypeata
 Gadwall, Mareca strepera
 Falcated duck, Mareca falcata (*)
 Eurasian wigeon, Mareca penelope
 American wigeon, Mareca americana
 Mallard, Anas platydiazirhynchos
 Mexican duck, Anas diazi (*)
 American black duck, Anas rubripes (*)
 Northern pintail, Anas acuta
 Green-winged teal, Anas crecca
 Canvasback, Aythya valisineria
 Redhead, Aythya americana
 Common pochard, Aythya ferina (*)
 Ring-necked duck, Aythya collaris
 Tufted duck, Aythya fuligula
 Greater scaup, Aythya marila
 Lesser scaup, Aythya affinis
 Steller's eider, Polysticta stelleri (*)
 King eider, Somateria spectabilis (*)
 Common eider, Somateria mollissima (*)
 Harlequin duck, Histrionicus histrionicus
 Surf scoter, Melanitta perspicillata
 White-winged scoter, Melanitta deglandi
 Common scoter, Melanitta nigra (*)
 Black scoter, Melanitta americana
 Long-tailed duck, Clangula hyemalis
 Bufflehead, Bucephala albeola
 Common goldeneye, Bucephala clangula
 Barrow's goldeneye, Bucephala islandica
 Smew, Mergellus albellus (*)
 Hooded merganser, Lophodytes cucullatus
 Common merganser, Mergus merganser
 Red-breasted merganser, Mergus serrator
 Ruddy duck, Oxyura jamaicensis

New World quail
Order: GalliformesFamily: Odontophoridae

The New World quails are small, plump terrestrial birds only distantly related to the quails of the Old World, but named for their similar appearance and habits.

 Mountain quail, Oreortyx pictus
 California quail, Callipepla californica
 Gambel's quail, Callipepla gambelii

Pheasants, grouse, and allies
Order: GalliformesFamily: Phasianidae

Phasianidae consists of the pheasants and their allies, including partridges, grouse, turkeys, and Old World quail. These are terrestrial species, variable in size but generally plump with broad relatively short wings. Many species are gamebirds or have been domesticated as a food source for humans.

 Wild turkey, Meleagris gallopavo (I)
 Ruffed grouse, Bonasa umbellus
 White-tailed ptarmigan, Lagopus leucurus (I)
 Sooty grouse, Dendragapus fuliginosus
 Sharp-tailed grouse, Tympanuchus phasianellus (Ex)
 Greater sage-grouse, Centrocercus urophasianus
 Ring-necked pheasant, Phasianus colchicus (I)
 Chukar, Alectoris chukar (I)

Grebes
Order: PodicipediformesFamily: Podicipedidae

Grebes are small to medium-large freshwater diving birds. They have lobed toes and are excellent swimmers and divers. However, they have their feet placed far back on the body, making them quite ungainly on land.

 Least grebe, Tachybaptus dominicus (*)
 Pied-billed grebe, Podilymbus podiceps
 Horned grebe, Podiceps auritus
 Red-necked grebe, Podiceps grisegena
 Eared grebe, Podiceps nigricollis
 Western grebe, Aechmorphorus occidentalis
 Clark's grebe, Aechmorphorus clarkii

Pigeons and doves
Order: ColumbiformesFamily: Columbidae

Pigeons and doves are stout-bodied birds with short necks and short slender bills with a fleshy cere.

 Rock pigeon, Columba livia (I)
 Band-tailed pigeon, Patagioenas fasciata
 Oriental turtle-dove, Streptopelia orientalis (*)
 Eurasian collared-dove, Streptopelia decaocto (I)
 Spotted dove, Spilopelia chinensis (I)
 Inca dove, Columbina inca
 Common ground dove, Columbina passerina
 Ruddy ground dove, Columbina talpacoti (*)
 White-winged dove, Zenaida asiatica
 Mourning dove, Zenaida macroura

Cuckoos
Order: CuculiformesFamily: Cuculidae

The family Cuculidae includes cuckoos, roadrunners, and anis. These birds are of variable size with slender bodies, long tails, and strong legs. The Old World cuckoos are brood parasites.

 Groove-billed ani, Crotophaga sulcirostris (*)
 Common cuckoo, Cuculus canorus (*)
 Greater roadrunner, Geococcyx californianus
 Yellow-billed cuckoo, Coccyzus americanus
 Black-billed cuckoo, Coccyzus erythropthalmus (*)

Nightjars and allies
Order: CaprimulgiformesFamily: Caprimulgidae

Nightjars are medium-sized nocturnal birds that usually nest on the ground. They have long wings, short legs, and very short bills. Most have small feet, of little use for walking, and long pointed wings. Their soft plumage is cryptically colored to resemble bark or leaves.

 Lesser nighthawk,  Chordeiles acutipennis
 Common nighthawk,  Chordeiles minor
 Common poorwill,  Phalaenoptilus nuttallii
 Chuck-will's-widow, Antrostomus carolinensis (*)
 Buff-collared nightjar, Antrostomus ridgwayi (*)
 Eastern whip-poor-will, Antrostomus vociferus (*)
 Mexican whip-poor-will, Antrostomus arizonae

Swifts
Order: ApodiformesFamily: Apodidae

The swifts are small birds which spend the majority of their lives flying. These birds have very short legs and never settle voluntarily on the ground, perching instead only on vertical surfaces. Many swifts have long swept-back wings which resemble a crescent or boomerang.

 Black swift, Cypseloides niger
 White-collared swift, Streptoprocne zonaris (*)
 Chimney swift, Chaetura pelagica
 Vaux's swift, Chaetura vauxi
 Common swift, Apus apus (*)
 White-throated swift, Aeronautes saxatalis

Hummingbirds
Order: ApodiformesFamily: Trochilidae

Hummingbirds are small birds capable of hovering in mid-air due to the rapid flapping of their wings. They are the only birds that can fly backwards.

 Mexican violetear, Colibri thalassinus (*)
 Rivoli's hummingbird, Eugenes fulgens (*)
 Blue-throated mountain-gem, Lampornis clemenciae (*)
 Ruby-throated hummingbird, Archilochus colubris (*)
 Black-chinned hummingbird, Archilochus alexandri
 Anna's hummingbird, Calypte anna
 Costa's hummingbird, Calypte costae
 Calliope hummingbird, Selasphorus calliope
 Rufous hummingbird, Selasphorus rufus
 Allen's hummingbird, Selasphorus sasin
 Broad-tailed hummingbird, Selasphorus platycercus
 Broad-billed hummingbird, Cynanthus latirostris (*)
 Xantus's hummingbird, Basilinna xantusii (*)
 Violet-crowned hummingbird, Leucolia violiceps (*)

Rails, gallinules, and coots
Order: GruiformesFamily: Rallidae

Rallidae is a large family of small to medium-sized birds which includes the rails, crakes, coots, and gallinules. The most typical family members occupy dense vegetation in damp environments near lakes, swamps, or rivers. In general they are shy and secretive birds, making them difficult to observe. Most species have strong legs and long toes which are well adapted to soft uneven surfaces. They tend to have short, rounded wings and to be weak fliers.

 Ridgway's rail, Rallus obsoletus
 Virginia rail, Rallus limicola
 Sora, Porzana carolina
 Common gallinule, Gallinula galeata
 American coot, Fulica americana
 Purple gallinule, Porphyrio martinicus (*)
 Yellow rail, Coturnicops noveboracensis
 Black rail, Laterallus jamaicensis

Cranes
Order: GruiformesFamily: Gruidae

Cranes are large, long-legged, long-necked birds. Unlike the similar-looking but unrelated herons, cranes fly with necks outstretched, not pulled back. Most have elaborate and noisy courting displays or "dances".

 Demoiselle crane, Anthropoides virgo (UO)
 Sandhill crane, Antigone canadensis
 Common crane, Grus grus (*)

Stilts and avocets
Order: CharadriiformesFamily: Recurvirostridae

Recurvirostridae is a family of large wading birds which includes the avocets and stilts. The avocets have long legs and long up-curved bills. The stilts have extremely long legs and long, thin, straight bills.

 Black-necked stilt, Himantopus mexicanus
 American avocet, Recurvirostra americana

Oystercatchers
Order: CharadriiformesFamily: Haematopodidae

The oystercatchers are large, obvious, and noisy plover-like birds, with strong bills used for smashing or prising open molluscs.

 American oystercatcher, Haematopus palliatus
 Black oystercatcher, Haematopus bachmani

Plovers and lapwings
Order: CharadriiformesFamily: Charadriidae

The family Charadriidae includes the plovers, dotterels, and lapwings. They are small to medium-sized birds with compact bodies, short thick necks, and long, usually pointed, wings. They are found in open country worldwide, mostly in habitats near water.

 Black-bellied plover, Pluvialis squatarola
 American golden-plover, Pluvialis dominica 
 Pacific golden-plover, Pluvialis fulva
 Eurasian dotterel, Charadrius morinellus (*)
 Killdeer, Charadrius vociferus
 Common ringed plover, Charadrius hiaticula (*)
 Semipalmated plover, Charadrius semipalmatus
 Piping plover, Charadrius melodus (*)
 Lesser sand-plover, Charadrius mongolus (*)
 Greater sand-plover, Charadrius leschenaultii (*)
 Wilson's plover, Charadrius wilsonia (*)
 Snowy plover, Charadrius nivosus
 Mountain plover, Charadrius montanus

Sandpipers and allies
Order: CharadriiformesFamily: Scolopacidae

Scolopacidae is a large diverse family of small to medium-sized shorebirds including the sandpipers, curlews, godwits, shanks, tattlers, woodcocks, snipes, dowitchers, and phalaropes. The majority of these species eat small invertebrates picked out of the mud or soil. Different lengths of legs and bills enable multiple species to feed in the same habitat, particularly on the coast, without direct competition for food.

 Upland sandpiper, Bartramia longicauda (*)
 Bristle-thighed curlew, Numenius tahitiensis (*)
 Whimbrel, Numenius phaeopus
 Little curlew, Numenius minutus (*)
 Long-billed curlew, Numenius americanus
 Bar-tailed godwit, Limosa lapponica (*)
 Hudsonian godwit, Limosa haemastica (*)
 Marbled godwit, Limosa fedoa
 Ruddy turnstone, Arenaria interpres
 Black turnstone, Arenaria melanocephala
 Red knot, Calidris canutus
 Surfbird, Calidris virgata
 Ruff, Calidris pugnax
 Sharp-tailed sandpiper, Calidris acuminata
 Stilt sandpiper, Calidris himantopus
 Curlew sandpiper, Calidris ferruginea (*)
 Long-toed stint, Calidris subminuta (*)
 Red-necked stint, Calidris ruficollis (*)
 Sanderling, Calidris alba
 Dunlin, Calidris alpina
 Rock sandpiper, Calidris ptilocnemis
 Purple sandpiper, Calidris maritima (*)
 Baird's sandpiper, Calidris bairdii
 Little stint, Calidris minuta (*)
 Least sandpiper, Calidris minutilla
 White-rumped sandpiper, Calidris fuscicollis (*)
 Buff-breasted sandpiper, Calidris subruficollis
 Pectoral sandpiper, Calidris melanotos
 Semipalmated sandpiper, Calidris pusilla
 Western sandpiper, Calidris mauri
 Short-billed dowitcher, Limnodromus griseus
 Long-billed dowitcher, Limnodromus scolopaceus
 Jack snipe, Lymnocryptes minimus (*)
 American woodcock, Scolopax minor (*)
 Common snipe, Gallinago gallinago (*)
 Wilson's snipe, Gallinago delicata
 Terek sandpiper, Xenus cinereus (*)
 Spotted sandpiper, Actitis macularia
 Solitary sandpiper, Tringa solitaria
 Gray-tailed tattler, Tringa brevipes (*)
 Wandering tattler, Tringa incana
 Lesser yellowlegs, Tringa flavipes
 Willet, Tringa semipalmata
 Spotted redshank, Tringa erythropus (*)
 Common greenshank, Tringa nebularia (*)
 Greater yellowlegs, Tringa melanoleuca
 Wood sandpiper, Tringa glareola (*)
 Marsh sandpiper, Tringa stagnatilis (*)
 Wilson's phalarope, Phalaropus tricolor
 Red-necked phalarope, Phalaropus lobatus
 Red phalarope, Phalaropus fulicarius

Skuas and jaegers
Order: CharadriiformesFamily: Stercorariidae

Skuas and jaegers are in general medium to large birds, typically with gray or brown plumage, often with white markings on the wings. They have longish bills with hooked tips and webbed feet with sharp claws. They look like large dark gulls, but have a fleshy cere above the upper mandible. They are strong, acrobatic fliers.

 South polar skua, Stercorarius maccormicki
 Pomarine jaeger, Stercorarius pomarinus
 Parasitic jaeger, Stercorarius parasiticus
 Long-tailed jaeger, Stercorarius longicaudus

Auks, murres, and puffins
Order: CharadriiformesFamily: Alcidae

Alcids are superficially similar to penguins due to their black-and-white colors, their upright posture, and some of their habits. However, they are only distantly related to the penguins and are able to fly. Auks live on the open sea, only deliberately coming ashore to nest.

 Common murre, Uria aalge
 Thick-billed murre, Uria lomvia (*)
 Pigeon guillemot, Cepphus columba
 Long-billed murrelet, Brachyramphus perdix (*)
 Marbled murrelet, Brachyramphus marmoratus
 Kittlitz's murrelet, Brachyramphus brevirostris (*)
 Scripps's murrelet, Synthliboramphus scrippsi
 Guadalupe murrelet, Synthliboramphus hypoleucus
 Craveri's murrelet, Synthliboramphus craveri
 Ancient murrelet, Synthliboramphus antiquus
 Cassin's auklet, Ptychoramphus aleuticus
 Parakeet auklet, Aethia psittacula
 Least auklet, Aethia pusilla (*)
 Crested auklet, Aethia cristatella (*)
 Rhinoceros auklet, Cerorhinca monocerata
 Horned puffin, Fratercula corniculata
 Tufted puffin, Fratercula cirrhata

Gulls, terns, and skimmers
Order: CharadriiformesFamily: Laridae

Laridae is a family of medium to large seabirds and includes gulls, terns, kittiwakes, and skimmers. They are typically gray or white, often with black markings on the head or wings. They have stout, longish bills and webbed feet.

 Swallow-tailed gull, Creagrus furcatus (*)
 Black-legged kittiwake, Rissa tridactyla
 Red-legged kittiwake, Rissa brevirostris (*)
 Ivory gull, Pagophila eburnea (*)
 Sabine's gull, Xema sabini
 Bonaparte's gull, Chroicocephalus philadelphia
 Black-headed gull, Chroicocephalus ridibundus (*)
 Little gull, Hydrocoloeus minutus
 Ross's gull, Rhodostethia rosea (*)
 Laughing gull, Leucophaeus atricilla
 Franklin's gull, Leucophaeus pipixcan
 Belcher's gull, Larus belcheri (*)
 Black-tailed gull, Larus crassirostris (*)
 Heermann's gull, Larus heermanni
 Short-billed gull, Larus brachyrhynchus
 Ring-billed gull, Larus delawarensis
 Western gull, Larus occidentalis
 Yellow-footed gull, Larus livens
 California gull, Larus californicus
 Herring gull, Larus argentatus
 Iceland gull, Larus glaucoides
 Lesser black-backed gull, Larus fuscus
 Slaty-backed gull, Larus schistisagus (*)
 Glaucous-winged gull, Larus glaucescens
 Glaucous gull, Larus hyperboreus
 Great black-backed gull, Larus marinus (*)
 Kelp gull, Larus dominicanus (*)
 Sooty tern, Onychoprion fuscata (*)
 Bridled tern, Onychoprion anaethetus (*)
 Least tern, Sternula antillarum
 Gull-billed tern, Gelochelidon nilotica
 Caspian tern, Hydroprogne caspia
 Black tern, Chlidonias niger
 White-winged tern, Chlidonias leucopterus (*)
 Common tern, Sterna hirundo
 Arctic tern, Sterna paradisaea
 Forster's tern, Sterna forsteri
 Royal tern, Thalasseus maximus
 Sandwich tern, Thalasseus sandvicensis (*)
 Elegant tern, Thalasseus elegans
 Black skimmer, Rynchops niger

Tropicbirds
Order: PhaethontiformesFamily: Phaethontidae

Tropicbirds are slender white birds of tropical oceans with exceptionally long central tail feathers. Their long wings have black markings, as does the head.

 White-tailed tropicbird, Phaethon lepturus (*)
 Red-billed tropicbird, Phaethon aethereus
 Red-tailed tropicbird, Phaethon rubricauda (*)

Loons 
Order: GaviiformesFamily: Gaviidae

Loons are aquatic birds, the size of a large duck, to which they are unrelated. Their plumage is largely gray or black, and they have spear-shaped bills. Loons swim well and fly adequately, but are almost hopeless on land, because their legs are placed towards the rear of the body.

 Red-throated loon, Gavia stellata
 Arctic loon, Gavia arctica (*)
 Pacific loon, Gavia pacifica
 Common loon, Gavia immer
 Yellow-billed loon, Gavia adamsii (*)

Albatrosses
Order: ProcellariiformesFamily: Diomedeidae

The albatrosses are amongst the largest of flying birds, and the great albatrosses from the genus Diomedea have the largest wingspans of any extant birds.

 White-capped albatross, Thalassarche cauta (*)
 Chatham albatross, Thalassarche eremita (*)
 Salvin's albatross, Thalassarche salvini (*)
 Light-mantled albatross, Phoebetria palpebrata (*)
 Wandering albatross, Diomedea exulans (*)
 Laysan albatross, Phoebastria immutabilis
 Black-footed albatross, Phoebastria nigripes
 Short-tailed albatross, Phoebastria albatrus (*)

Southern storm-petrels

Order: ProcellariiformesFamily: Oceanitidae

The storm-petrels are the smallest seabirds, relatives of the petrels, feeding on planktonic crustaceans and small fish picked from the surface, typically while hovering. The flight is fluttering and sometimes bat-like. Until 2018, this family's three species were included with the other storm-petrels in family Hydrobatidae.

Wilson's storm-petrel, Oceanites oceanicus

Northern storm-petrels
Order: ProcellariiformesFamily: Hydrobatidae

Though the members of this family are similar in many respects to the southern storm-petrels, including their general appearance and habits, there are enough genetic differences to warrant their placement in a separate family.

 Fork-tailed storm-petrel, Hydrobates furcatus
 Ringed storm-petrel, Hydrobates hornbyi (*)
 Leach's storm-petrel, Hydrobates leucorhous
 Townsend's storm-petrel, Hydrobates socorroensis
 Ashy storm-petrel, Hydrobates homochroa
 Band-rumped storm-petrel, Hydrobates castro (*)
 Wedge-rumped storm-petrel, Hydrobates tethys (*)
 Black storm-petrel, Hydrobates melania
 Tristram's storm-petrel, Hydrobates tristrami (*)
 Least storm-petrel, Hydrobates microsoma

Shearwaters and petrels
Order: ProcellariiformesFamily: Procellariidae

The procellariids are the main group of medium-sized "true petrels", characterized by united nostrils with medium septum and a long outer functional primary.

 Northern fulmar, Fulmarus glacialis
 Gray-faced petrel, Pterodroma gouldi (*)
 Kermadec petrel, Pterodroma neglecta (*)
 Murphy's petrel, Pterodroma ultima
 Mottled petrel, Pterodroma inexpectata
 Hawaiian petrel, Pterodroma sandwichensis
 Cook's petrel, Pterodroma cookii
 Stejneger's petrel, Pterodroma longirostris (*)
 Bulwer's petrel, Bulweria bulwerii (*)
 Jouanin's petrel, Bulweria fallax (*)
 White-chinned petrel, Procellaria aequinoctialis (*)
 Parkinson's petrel, Procellaria parkinsoni (*)
 Streaked shearwater, Calonectris leucomelas (*)
 Cory's shearwater, Calonectris diomedea (*)
 Wedge-tailed shearwater, Ardenna pacificus (*)
 Buller's shearwater, Ardenna bulleri
 Short-tailed shearwater, Ardenna tenuirostris
 Sooty shearwater, Ardenna griseus
 Great shearwater, Ardenna gravis (*)
 Pink-footed shearwater, Ardenna creatopus
 Flesh-footed shearwater, Ardenna carneipes
 Manx shearwater, Puffinus puffinus (*)
 Newell's shearwater, Puffinus newelli (*)
 Black-vented shearwater, Puffinus opisthomelas

Storks
Order: CiconiiformesFamily: Ciconiidae

Storks are large, heavy, long-legged, long-necked wading birds with long stout bills and wide wingspans. They lack the powder down that other wading birds such as herons, spoonbills, and ibises use to clean off fish slime. Storks lack a pharynx and are mute.

 Wood stork, Mycteria americana (*)

Frigatebirds
Order: SuliformesFamily: Fregatidae

Frigatebirds are large seabirds usually found over tropical oceans. They are large, black or black-and-white, with long wings and deeply forked tails. The males have colored inflatable throat pouches. They do not swim or walk and cannot take off from a flat surface. Having the largest wingspan-to-body-weight ratio of any bird, they are essentially aerial, able to stay aloft for more than a week.

 Lesser frigatebird, Fregata ariel (*)
 Magnificent frigatebird, Fregata magnificens
 Great frigatebird, Fregata minor (*)

Boobies and gannets
Order: SuliformesFamily: Sulidae

The sulids comprise the gannets and boobies. Both groups are medium-large coastal seabirds that plunge-dive for fish.

 Masked booby, Sula dactylatra (*)
 Nazca booby, Sula granti
 Blue-footed booby, Sula nebouxii
 Brown booby, Sula leucogaster
 Red-footed booby, Sula sula (*)
 Northern gannet, Morus bassanus (*)

Anhingas
Order: SuliformesFamily: Anhingidae

Anhingas are cormorant-like water birds with very long necks and long straight beaks. They are fish eaters which often swim with only their neck above the water.

 Anhinga, Anhinga anhinga (*)

Cormorants and shags

Order: SuliformesFamily: Phalacrocoracidae

Cormorants are medium-to-large aquatic birds, usually with mainly dark plumage and areas of colored skin on the face. The bill is long, thin, and sharply hooked. Their feet are four-toed and webbed.

 Brandt's cormorant, Urile penicillatus
 Pelagic cormorant, Urile pelagicus
 Double-crested cormorant, Nannopterum auritum
 Neotropic cormorant, Nannopterum brasilianum

Pelicans
Order: PelecaniformesFamily: Pelecanidae

Pelicans are very large water birds with a distinctive pouch under their beak. Like other birds in the order Pelecaniformes, they have four webbed toes.

 American white pelican, Pelecanus erythrorhynchos
 Brown pelican, Pelecanus occidentalis

Herons, egrets, and bitterns
Order: PelecaniformesFamily: Ardeidae

The family Ardeidae contains the herons, egrets, and bitterns. Herons and egrets are medium to large wading birds with long necks and legs. Bitterns tend to be shorter-necked and more secretive. Members of Ardeidae fly with their necks retracted, unlike other long-necked birds such as storks, ibises, and spoonbills.

 American bittern, Botaurus lentiginosus
 Least bittern, Ixobrychus exilis
 Great blue heron, Ardea herodias
 Great egret, Ardea alba
 Snowy egret, Egretta thula
 Little blue heron, Egretta caerulea
 Tricolored heron, Egretta tricolor (*)
 Reddish egret, Egretta rufescens
 Cattle egret, Bubulcus ibis
 Green heron, Butorides virescens
 Black-crowned night-heron, Nycticorax nycticorax
 Yellow-crowned night-heron, Nyctanassa violacea

Ibises and spoonbills
Order: PelecaniformesFamily: Threskiornithidae

The family Threskiornithidae includes the ibises and spoonbills. They have long, broad wings. Their bodies tend to be elongated, the neck more so, with rather long legs. The bill is also long, decurved in the case of the ibises, straight and distinctively flattened in the spoonbills.

 White ibis, Eudocimus albus (*)
 Glossy ibis, Plegadis falcinellus (*)
 White-faced ibis, Plegadis chihi
 Roseate spoonbill, Platalea ajaja (*)

New World vultures
Order: CathartiformesFamily: Cathartidae

The New World vultures are not closely related to Old World vultures, but superficially resemble them because of convergent evolution. Like the Old World vultures, they are scavengers. However, unlike Old World vultures, which find carcasses by sight, New World vultures have a good sense of smell with which they locate carcasses.

 California condor, Gymnogyps californianus (RI)
 Black vulture, Coragyps atratus (*)
 Turkey vulture, Cathartes aura

Osprey

Order: AccipitriformesFamily: Pandionidae

Pandionidae is a monotypic family of fish-eating birds of prey.  Its single species possesses a very large and powerful hooked beak, strong legs, strong talons, and keen eyesight.

 Osprey, Pandion haliaetus

Hawks, eagles, and kites
Order: AccipitriformesFamily: Accipitridae

Accipitridae is a family of birds of prey which includes hawks, eagles, kites, harriers, and Old World vultures. These birds have very large powerful hooked beaks for tearing flesh from their prey, strong legs, powerful talons, and keen eyesight.

 White-tailed kite, Elanus leucurus
 Swallow-tailed kite, Elanoides forficatus (*)
 Golden eagle, Aquila chrysaetos
 Northern harrier, Circus hudsonius
 Sharp-shinned hawk, Accipiter striatus
 Cooper's hawk, Accipiter cooperii
 Northern goshawk, Accipiter gentilis
 Bald eagle, Haliaeetus leucocephalus
 Mississippi kite, Ictinia mississippiensis (*)
 Common black hawk, Buteogallus anthracinus (*)
 Harris's hawk, Parabuteo unicinctus
 Gray hawk, Buteo plagiatus (*)
 Red-shouldered hawk, Buteo lineatus
 Broad-winged hawk, Buteo platypterus
 Swainson's hawk, Buteo swainsoni
 Zone-tailed hawk, Buteo albonotatus
 Red-tailed hawk, Buteo jamaicensis
 Rough-legged hawk, Buteo lagopus
 Ferruginous hawk, Buteo regalis

Barn-owls
Order: StrigiformesFamily: Tytonidae

Barn-owls are medium to large owls with large heads and characteristic heart-shaped faces. They have long strong legs with powerful talons.

 Barn owl, Tyto alba

Owls
Order: StrigiformesFamily: Strigidae

Typical owls are small to large solitary nocturnal birds of prey. They have large forward-facing eyes and ears, a hawk-like beak, and a conspicuous circle of feathers around each eye called a facial disk.

 Flammulated owl, Psiloscops flammeolus
 Western screech-owl, Megascops kennicottii
 Great horned owl, Bubo virginianus
 Snowy owl, Bubo scandiacus (*)
 Northern pygmy-owl, Glaucidium gnoma
 Elf owl, Micrathene whitneyi (*)
 Burrowing owl, Athene cunicularia
 Spotted owl, Strix occidentalis
 Barred owl, Strix varia
 Great gray owl, Strix nebulosa
 Long-eared owl, Asio otus
 Short-eared owl, Asio flammeus
 Northern saw-whet owl, Aegolius acadicus

Kingfishers
Order: CoraciiformesFamily: Alcedinidae

Kingfishers are medium-sized birds with large heads, long pointed bills, short legs, and stubby tails.

 Belted kingfisher, Megaceryle alcyon

Woodpeckers
Order: PiciformesFamily: Picidae

Woodpeckers are small to medium-sized birds with chisel-like beaks, short legs, stiff tails, and long tongues used for capturing insects. Some species have feet with two toes pointing forward and two backward, while several species have only three toes. Many woodpeckers have the habit of tapping noisily on tree trunks with their beaks.

 Eurasian wryneck, Jynx torquilla (*)
 Lewis's woodpecker, Melanerpes lewis
 Red-headed woodpecker, Melanerpes erythrocephalus (*)
 Acorn woodpecker, Melanerpes formicivorus
 Gila woodpecker, Melanerpes uropygialis
 Williamson's sapsucker, Sphyrapicus thyroideus
 Yellow-bellied sapsucker, Sphyrapicus varius
 Red-naped sapsucker, Sphyrapicus nuchalis
 Red-breasted sapsucker, Sphyrapicus ruber
 Black-backed woodpecker, Picoides arcticus
 Downy woodpecker, Dryobates pubescens
 Nuttall's woodpecker, Dryobates nuttallii
 Ladder-backed woodpecker, Dryobates scalaris
 Hairy woodpecker, Dryobates villosus
 White-headed woodpecker, Dryobates albolarvatus
 Northern flicker, Colaptes auratus
 Gilded flicker, Colaptes chrysoides
 Pileated woodpecker, Dryocopus pileatus

Falcons and caracaras
Order: FalconiformesFamily: Falconidae

Falconidae is a family of diurnal birds of prey, notably the falcons and caracaras. They differ from hawks, eagles, and kites in that they kill with their beaks instead of their talons.

 Crested caracara, Caracara plancus (*)
 Eurasian kestrel, Falco tinnunculus (*)
 American kestrel, Falco sparverius
 Merlin, Falco columbarius
 Gyrfalcon, Falco rusticolus (*)
 Peregrine falcon, Falco peregrinus
 Prairie falcon, Falco mexicanus

New World and African parrots

Order: PsittaciformesFamily: Psittacidae

Characteristic features of parrots include a strong curved bill, an upright stance, strong legs, and clawed zygodactyl feet. Many parrots are vividly colored, and some are multi-colored. Most of the more than 150 species in this family are found in the New World.

 Yellow-chevroned parakeet, Brotogeris chiriri (I)
 Red-crowned parrot, Amazona viridigenalis (I)

Tyrant flycatchers
Order: PasseriformesFamily: Tyrannidae

Tyrant flycatchers are Passerine birds which occur throughout North and South America. They superficially resemble the Old World flycatchers, but are more robust and have stronger bills. They do not have the sophisticated vocal capabilities of the songbirds. Most, but not all, are rather plain. As the name implies, most are insectivorous.

 Dusky-capped flycatcher, Myiarchus tuberculifer
 Ash-throated flycatcher, Myiarchus cinerascens
 Nutting's flycatcher, Myiarchus nuttingi (*)
 Great crested flycatcher, Myiarchus crinitus (*)
 Brown-crested flycatcher, Myiarchus tyrannulus
 Sulphur-bellied flycatcher, Myiodynastes luteiventris (*)
 Tropical kingbird, Tyrannus melancholicus
 Couch's kingbird, Tyrannus couchii (*)
 Cassin's kingbird, Tyrannus vociferans
 Thick-billed kingbird, Tyrannus crassirostris (*)
 Western kingbird, Tyrannus verticalis
 Eastern kingbird, Tyrannus tyrannus
 Scissor-tailed flycatcher, Tyrannus forficatus
 Fork-tailed flycatcher, Tyrannus savana (*)
 Olive-sided flycatcher, Contopus cooperi
 Greater pewee, Contopus pertinax (*)
 Western wood-pewee, Contopus sordidulus
 Eastern wood-pewee, Contopus virens (*)
 Yellow-bellied flycatcher, Empidonax flaviventris (*)
 Alder flycatcher, Empidonax alnorum (*)
 Willow flycatcher, Empidonax traillii
 Least flycatcher, Empidonax minimus
 Hammond's flycatcher, Empidonax hammondii
 Gray flycatcher, Empidonax wrightii
 Dusky flycatcher, Empidonax oberholseri
 Pacific-slope flycatcher, Empidonax difficilis
 Cordilleran flycatcher, Empidonax occidentalis
 Buff-breasted flycatcher, Empidonax fulvifrons (*)
 Black phoebe, Sayornis nigricans
 Eastern phoebe, Sayornis phoebe
 Say's phoebe, Sayornis saya
 Vermilion flycatcher, Pyrocephalus rubinus

Vireos, shrike-babblers, and erpornis
Order: PasseriformesFamily: Vireonidae

The vireos and greenlets are a group of small to medium-sized passerine birds mostly restricted to the New World, though a few members of the family, called shrike-babblers, are found in Asia. They are typically greenish in color and resemble wood-warblers apart from their heavier bills.

 White-eyed vireo, Vireo griseus (*)
 Bell's vireo, Vireo bellii
 Gray vireo, Vireo vicinior
 Hutton's vireo, Vireo huttoni
 Yellow-throated vireo, Vireo flavifrons
 Cassin's vireo, Vireo cassinii
 Blue-headed vireo, Vireo solitarius (*)
 Plumbeous vireo, Vireo plumbeus
 Philadelphia vireo, Vireo philadelphicus
 Warbling vireo, Vireo gilvus
 Red-eyed vireo, Vireo olivaceus
 Yellow-green vireo, Vireo flavoviridis

Shrikes
Order: PasseriformesFamily: Laniidae

Shrikes are passerine birds known for their habit of catching other birds and small animals and impaling the uneaten portions of their bodies on thorns. A shrike's beak is hooked, like that of a typical bird of prey.

 Brown shrike, Lanius cristatus (*)
 Loggerhead shrike, Lanius ludovicianus
 Northern shrike, Lanius borealis

Crows, jays, and magpies
Order: PasseriformesFamily: Corvidae

The family Corvidae includes crows, ravens, jays, choughs, magpies, treepies, nutcrackers, and ground jays. Corvids are above average in size among the Passeriformes, and some of the larger species show high levels of intelligence.

 Canada jay, Perisoreus canadensis
 Pinyon jay, Gymnorhinus cyanocephalus
 Steller's jay, Cyanocitta stelleri
 Blue jay, Cyanocitta cristata (*)
 Island scrub-jay, Aphelocoma insularis (En)
 California scrub-jay, Aphelocoma californica
 Woodhouse's scrub-jay, Aphelocoma woodhouseii
 Clark's nutcracker, Nucifraga columbiana
 Black-billed magpie, Pica hudsonia
 Yellow-billed magpie, Pica nuttalli (En)
 American crow, Corvus brachyrhynchos
 Common raven, Corvus corax

Penduline-tits
Order: PasseriformesFamily: Remizidae

The only member of this family in the New World, the verdin is one of the smallest passerines in North America. It is gray overall and adults have a bright yellow head and rufous "shoulder patch" (the lesser coverts). Verdins are insectivorous, continuously foraging among the desert trees and scrubs. They are usually solitary except when they pair up to construct their conspicuous nests.

 Verdin, Auriparus flaviceps

Tits, chickadees, and titmice

Order: PasseriformesFamily: Paridae

The Paridae are mainly small stocky woodland species with short stout bills. Some have crests. They are adaptable birds, with a mixed diet including seeds and insects.

 Black-capped chickadee, Poecile atricapilla
 Mountain chickadee, Poecile gambeli
 Chestnut-backed chickadee, Poecile rufescens
 Oak titmouse, Baeolophus inornatus
 Juniper titmouse, Baeolophus ridgwayi

Larks
Order: PasseriformesFamily: Alaudidae

Larks are small terrestrial birds with often extravagant songs and display flights. Most larks are fairly dull in appearance. Their food is insects and seeds.

 Eurasian skylark, Alauda arvensis (*)
 Horned lark, Eremophila alpestris

Grassbirds and allies
Order: PasseriformesFamily: Locustellidae

Locustellidae are a family of small insectivorous songbirds found mainly in Eurasia, Africa, and the Australian region. They are smallish birds with tails that are usually long and pointed, and tend to be drab brownish or buffy all over.

 Lanceolated warbler, Locustella lanceolata (*)

Swallows
Order: PasseriformesFamily: Hirundinidae

The family Hirundinidae is adapted to aerial feeding. They have a slender streamlined body, long pointed wings, and a short bill with a wide gape. The feet are adapted to perching rather than walking, and the front toes are partially joined at the base.

 Bank swallow, Riparia riparia
 Tree swallow, Tachycineta bicolor
 Violet-green swallow, Tachycineta thalassina
 Northern rough-winged swallow, Stelgidopteryx serripennis
 Purple martin, Progne subis
 Barn swallow, Hirundo rustica
 Cliff swallow, Petrochelidon pyrrhonota
 Cave swallow, Petrochelidon fulva (*)

Long-tailed tits
Order: PasseriformesFamily: Aegithalidae

The long-tailed tits are a family of small passerine birds with medium to long tails. They make woven bag nests in trees. Most eat a mixed diet which includes insects.

 Bushtit, Psaltriparus minimus

Leaf warblers
Order: PasseriformesFamily: Phylloscopidae

Leaf warblers are a family of small insectivorous birds found mostly in Eurasia and ranging into Wallacea and Africa. The Arctic warbler breeds east into Alaska. The species are of various sizes, often green-plumaged above and yellow below, or more subdued with grayish-green to grayish-brown colors.

 Yellow-browed warbler, Phylloscopus inornatus (*)
 Dusky warbler, Phylloscopus fuscatus (*)
 Arctic warbler/Kamchatka leaf warbler, Phylloscopus borealis/examinandus (*)

Bulbuls
Order: PasseriformesFamily: Pycnonotidae

The bulbuls are a family of medium-sized passerine songbirds native to Africa and tropical Asia. These are noisy and gregarious birds with often beautiful striking songs.

Red-whiskered bulbul Pycnonotus jocosus (I)

Sylviid warblers, parrotbills, and allies
Order: PasseriformesFamily: Sylviidae

The family Sylviidae is a group of small insectivorous passerine birds. They mainly occur as breeding species, as the common name implies, in Europe, Asia, and to a lesser extent Africa. Most are of generally undistinguished appearance, but many have distinctive songs.

 Wrentit, Chamaea fasciata

Kinglets
Order: PasseriformesFamily: Regulidae

The kinglets are a small family of birds which resemble the titmice. They are very small insectivorous birds. The adults have colored crowns, giving rise to their name.

 Ruby-crowned kinglet, Corthylio calendula
 Golden-crowned kinglet, Regulus satrapa

Waxwings
Order: PasseriformesFamily: Bombycillidae

The waxwings are a group of birds with soft silky plumage and unique red tips to some of the wing feathers. In the Bohemian and cedar waxwings, these tips look like sealing wax and give the group its name. These are arboreal birds of northern forests. They live on insects in summer and berries in winter.

 Bohemian waxwing, Bombycilla garrulus
 Cedar waxwing, Bombycilla cedrorum

Silky-flycatchers
Order: PasseriformesFamily: Ptiliogonatidae

The silky-flycatchers are a small family of passerine birds which occur mainly in Central America. They are related to waxwings and most species have small crests.

 Gray silky-flycatcher, Ptiliogonys cinereus (UO)
 Phainopepla, Phainopepla nitens

Nuthatches

Order: PasseriformesFamily: Sittidae

Nuthatches are small woodland birds. They have the unusual ability to climb down trees head first, unlike other birds which can only go upwards. Nuthatches have big heads, short tails, and powerful bills and feet.

 Red-breasted nuthatch, Sitta canadensis
 White-breasted nuthatch, Sitta carolinensis
 Pygmy nuthatch, Sitta pygmaea

Treecreepers
Order: PasseriformesFamily: Certhiidae

Treecreepers are small woodland birds, brown above and white below. They have thin pointed down-curved bills, which they use to extricate insects from bark. They have stiff tail feathers, like woodpeckers, which they use to support themselves on vertical trees.

 Brown creeper, Certhia americana

Gnatcatchers
Order: PasseriformesFamily: Polioptilidae

These dainty birds resemble Old World warblers in their structure and habits, moving restlessly through the foliage seeking insects. The gnatcatchers are mainly soft bluish gray in color and have the typical insectivore's long sharp bill. Many species have distinctive black head patterns (especially males) and long, regularly cocked, black-and-white tails.

 Blue-gray gnatcatcher, Polioptila caerulea
 Black-tailed gnatcatcher, Polioptila melanura
 California gnatcatcher, Polioptila californica

Wrens
Order: PasseriformesFamily: Troglodytidae

Wrens are small and inconspicuous birds, except for their loud songs. They have short wings and thin down-turned bills. Several species often hold their tails upright. All are insectivorous.

 Rock wren, Salpinctes obsoletus
 Canyon wren, Catherpes mexicanus
 House wren, Troglodytes aedon
 Pacific wren, Troglodytes pacificus
 Winter wren, Troglodytes hiemalis (*)
 Sedge wren, Cistothorus platensis (*)
 Marsh wren, Cistothorus palustris
 Bewick's wren, Thryomanes bewickii
 Cactus wren, Campylorhynchus brunneicapillus

Mockingbirds and thrashers
Order: PasseriformesFamily: Mimidae

The mimids are a family of passerine birds which includes thrashers, mockingbirds, tremblers, and the New World catbirds. These birds are notable for their vocalization, especially their remarkable ability to mimic a wide variety of birds and other sounds heard outdoors. The species tend towards dull grays and browns in their appearance.

 Blue mockingbird, Melanotis caerulescens (UO)
 Gray catbird, Dumetella carolinensis
 Curve-billed thrasher, Toxostoma curvirostre (*)
 Brown thrasher, Toxostoma rufum
 Bendire's thrasher, Toxostoma bendirei
 Gray thrasher, Toxostoma cinereum (UO) (not on the AOS Check-list; placement is per the Clements taxonomy)
 California thrasher, Toxostoma redivivum
 LeConte's thrasher, Toxostoma lecontei
 Crissal thrasher, Toxostoma crissale
 Sage thrasher, Oreoscoptes montanus
 Northern mockingbird, Mimus polyglottos

Starlings
Order: PasseriformesFamily: Sturnidae

Starlings are small to medium-sized Old World passerine birds with strong feet. Their flight is strong and direct and most are very gregarious. Their preferred habitat is fairly open country, and they eat insects and fruit. The plumage of several species is dark with a metallic sheen.

 European starling, Sturnus vulgaris (I)

Dippers
Order: PasseriformesFamily: Cinclidae

Dippers are a group of perching birds whose habitat includes aquatic environments in the Americas, Europe, and Asia. They are named for their bobbing or dipping movements. These birds have adaptations which allows them to submerge and walk on the bottom to feed on insect larvae.

 American dipper, Cinclus mexicanus

Thrushes and allies
Order: PasseriformesFamily: Turdidae

The thrushes are a group of passerine birds that occur mainly but not exclusively in the Old World. They are plump, soft plumaged, small to medium-sized insectivores or sometimes omnivores, often feeding on the ground. Many have attractive songs.

 Western bluebird, Sialia mexicana
 Mountain bluebird, Sialia currucoides
 Townsend's solitaire, Myadestes townsendi
 Veery, Catharus fuscescens (*)
 Gray-cheeked thrush, Catharus minimus (*)
 Swainson's thrush, Catharus ustulatus
 Hermit thrush, Catharus guttatus
 Wood thrush, Hylocichla mustelina (*)
 Eyebrowed thrush, Turdus obscurus (*)
 Rufous-backed robin, Turdus rufopalliatus (*)
 American robin, Turdus migratorius
 Varied thrush, Ixoreus naevius

Old World flycatchers
Order: PasseriformesFamily: Muscicapidae

The Old World flycatchers form a large family of small passerine birds. These are mainly small arboreal insectivores, many of which, as the name implies, take their prey on the wing.

 Bluethroat, Cyanecula svecica (*)
 Red-flanked bluetail, Tarsiger cyanurus (*)
 Taiga flycatcher, Ficedula albicilla (*)
 Asian stonechat, Saxicola maurus (*)
 Northern wheatear, Oenanthe oenanthe (*)

Waxbills and allies
Order: PasseriformesFamily: Estrildidae

The members of this family are small passerine birds native to the Old World tropics. They are gregarious and often colonial seed eaters with short thick but pointed bills. They are all similar in structure and habits, but have wide variation in plumage colors and patterns.

 Scaly-breasted munia, Lonchura punctulata (I)

Old World sparrows
Order: PasseriformesFamily: Passeridae

Old World sparrows are small passerine birds. In general, sparrows tend to be small plump brownish or grayish birds with short tails and short powerful beaks. Sparrows are seed eaters, but they also consume small insects.

 House sparrow, Passer domesticus (I)

Wagtails and pipits
Order: PasseriformesFamily: Motacillidae

Motacillidae is a family of small passerine birds with medium to long tails. They include the wagtails, longclaws, and pipits. They are slender ground-feeding insectivores of open country.

 Eastern yellow wagtail, Motacilla tschutschensis (*)
 Citrine wagtail, Motacilla citreola (*)
 Gray wagtail, Motacilla cinerea (*)
 White wagtail, Motacilla alba (*)
 Olive-backed pipit, Anthus hodgsoni (*)
 Red-throated pipit, Anthus cervinus
 American pipit, Anthus rubescens
 Sprague's pipit, Anthus spragueii

Finches, euphonias, and allies
Order: PasseriformesFamily: Fringillidae

Finches are seed-eating passerine birds that are small to moderately large and have a strong beak, usually conical and in some species very large. All have twelve tail feathers and nine primaries. These birds have a bouncing flight with alternating bouts of flapping and gliding on closed wings, and most sing well.

 Brambling, Fringilla montifringilla (*)
 Evening grosbeak, Coccothraustes vespertinus
 Common rosefinch, Carpodacus erythrinus (*)
 Pine grosbeak, Pinicola enucleator
 Gray-crowned rosy-finch, Leucosticte tephrocotis
 Black rosy-finch, Leucosticte atrata (*)
 House finch, Haemorhous mexicanus
 Purple finch, Haemorhous purpureus
 Cassin's finch, Haemorhous cassinii
 Oriental greenfinch, Chloris sinica (*)
 Common redpoll, Acanthis flammea (*)
 Red crossbill, Loxia curvirostra
 White-winged crossbill, Loxia leucoptera (*)
 Pine siskin, Spinus pinus
 Lesser goldfinch, Spinus psaltria
 Lawrence's goldfinch, Spinus lawrencei
 American goldfinch, Spinus tristis

Longspurs and snow buntings
Order: PasseriformesFamily: Calcariidae

The Calcariidae are a group of passerine birds that had been traditionally grouped with the New World sparrows, but differ in a number of respects and are usually found in open grassy areas.

 Lapland longspur, Calcarius lapponicus
 Chestnut-collared longspur, Calcarius ornatus
 Smith's longspur, Calcarius pictus (*)
 Thick-billed longspur, Rhynchophanes mccownii
 Snow bunting, Plectrophenax nivalis (*)

Old World buntings
Order: PasseriformesFamily: Emberizidae

Emberizidae is a family of passerine birds containing a single genus. Until 2017, the New World sparrows (Passerellidae) were also considered part of this family.

 Little bunting, Emberiza pusilla (*)
 Rustic bunting, Emberiza rustica (*)

New World sparrows
Order: PasseriformesFamily: Passerellidae

Until 2017, these species were considered part of the family Emberizidae. Most of the species are known as sparrows, but these birds are not closely related to the Old World sparrows which are in the family Passeridae. Many of these have distinctive head patterns.

 Cassin's sparrow, Peucaea cassinii (*)
 Grasshopper sparrow, Ammodramus savannarum
 Black-throated sparrow, Amphispiza bilineata
 Lark sparrow, Chondestes grammacus
 Lark bunting, Calamospiza melanocorys
 Chipping sparrow, Spizella passerina
 Clay-colored sparrow, Spizella pallida
 Black-chinned sparrow, Spizella atrogularis
 Field sparrow, Spizella pusilla (*)
 Brewer's sparrow, Spizella breweri
 Fox sparrow, Passerella iliaca
 American tree sparrow, Spizelloides arborea
 Dark-eyed junco, Junco hyemalis
 White-crowned sparrow, Zonotrichia leucophrys
 Golden-crowned sparrow, Zonotrichia atricapilla
 Harris's sparrow, Zonotrichia querula
 White-throated sparrow, Zonotrichia albicollis
 Sagebrush sparrow, Artemisiospiza nevadensis
 Bell's sparrow, Artemisiospiza belli
 Vesper sparrow, Pooecetes gramineus
 LeConte's sparrow, Ammospiza leconteii (*)
 Nelson's sparrow, Ammospiza nelsoni
 Baird's sparrow, Centronyx bairdii (*)
 Savannah sparrow, Passerculus sandwichensis
 Song sparrow, Melospiza melodia
 Lincoln's sparrow, Melospiza lincolnii
 Swamp sparrow, Melospiza georgiana
 Abert's towhee, Melozone aberti
 California towhee, Melozone crissalis
 Rufous-crowned sparrow, Aimophila ruficeps
 Green-tailed towhee, Pipilo chlorurus
 Spotted towhee, Pipilo maculatus

Yellow-breasted chat
Order: PasseriformesFamily: Icteriidae

This species was historically placed in the wood-warblers (Parulidae) but nonetheless most authorities were unsure if it belonged there. It was placed in its own family in 2017.

Yellow-breasted chat, Icteria virens

Troupials and allies
Order: PasseriformesFamily: Icteridae

The icterids are a group of small to medium-sized, often colorful passerine birds restricted to the New World and include the grackles, New World blackbirds, and New World orioles. Most species have black as a predominant plumage color, often enlivened by yellow, orange, or red.

 Yellow-headed blackbird, Xanthocephalus xanthocephalus
 Bobolink, Dolichonyx oryzivorus
 Western meadowlark, Sturnella neglecta
 Eastern meadowlark, Sturnella magna (*)
 Orchard oriole, Icterus spurius
 Hooded oriole, Icterus cucullatus
 Streak-backed oriole, Icterus pustulatus (*)
 Bullock's oriole, Icterus bullockii
 Baltimore oriole, Icterus galbula
 Black-backed oriole, Icterus abeillei (UO)
 Scott's oriole, Icterus parisorum
 Red-winged blackbird, Agelaius phoeniceus
 Tricolored blackbird, Agelaius tricolor
 Bronzed cowbird, Molothrus aeneus
 Brown-headed cowbird, Molothrus ater
 Rusty blackbird, Euphagus carolinus
 Brewer's blackbird, Euphagus cyanocephalus
 Common grackle, Quiscalus quiscula (*)
 Great-tailed grackle, Quiscalus mexicanus

New World warblers
Order: PasseriformesFamily: Parulidae

The wood warblers are a group of small and often colorful passerine birds restricted to the New World. Most are arboreal, but some are more terrestrial. Most members of this family are insectivores.

 Ovenbird, Seiurus aurocapilla
 Worm-eating warbler, Helmitheros vermivorum (*)
 Louisiana waterthrush, Parkesia motacilla (*)
 Northern waterthrush, Parkesia noveboracensis
 Golden-winged warbler, Vermivora chrysoptera (*)
 Blue-winged warbler, Vermivora cyanoptera (*)
 Black-and-white warbler, Mniotilta varia
 Prothonotary warbler, Protonotaria citrea
 Tennessee warbler, Leiothlypis peregrina
 Orange-crowned warbler, Leiothlypis celata
 Lucy's warbler, Leiothlypis luciae
 Nashville warbler, Leiothlypis ruficapilla
 Virginia's warbler, Leiothlypis virginiae
 Connecticut warbler, Oporornis agilis (*)
 MacGillivray's warbler, Geothlypis tolmiei
 Mourning warbler, Geothlypis philadelphia (*)
 Kentucky warbler, Geothlypis formosa
 Common yellowthroat, Geothlypis trichas
 Hooded warbler, Setophaga citrina
 American redstart, Setophaga ruticilla
 Cape May warbler, Setophaga tigrina (*)
 Cerulean warbler, Setophaga cerulea (*)
 Northern parula, Setophaga americana
 Tropical parula, Setophaga pitiayumi (*)
 Magnolia warbler, Setophaga magnolia
 Bay-breasted warbler, Setophaga castanea
 Blackburnian warbler, Setophaga fusca
 Yellow warbler, Setophaga petechia
 Chestnut-sided warbler, Setophaga pensylvanica
 Blackpoll warbler, Setophaga striata
 Black-throated blue warbler, Setophaga caerulescens
 Palm warbler, Setophaga palmarum
 Pine warbler, Setophaga pinus
 Yellow-rumped warbler, Setophaga coronata
 Yellow-throated warbler, Setophaga dominica
 Prairie warbler, Setophaga discolor
 Grace's warbler, Setophaga graciae (*)
 Black-throated gray warbler, Setophaga nigrescens
 Townsend's warbler, Setophaga townsendi
 Hermit warbler, Setophaga occidentalis
 Golden-cheeked warbler, Setophaga chrysoparia (*)
 Black-throated green warbler, Setophaga virens
 Canada warbler, Cardellina canadensis
 Wilson's warbler, Cardellina pusilla
 Red-faced warbler, Cardellina rubrifrons (*)
 Painted redstart, Myioborus pictus

Cardinals and allies
Order: PasseriformesFamily: Cardinalidae

The cardinals are a family of robust seed-eating birds with strong bills. They are typically associated with open woodland. The sexes usually have distinct plumages.

 Hepatic tanager, Piranga flava
 Summer tanager, Piranga rubra
 Scarlet tanager, Piranga olivacea 
 Western tanager, Piranga ludoviciana
 Northern cardinal, Cardinalis cardinalis
 Pyrrhuloxia, Cardinalis sinuatus (*)
 Rose-breasted grosbeak, Pheucticus ludovicianus
 Black-headed grosbeak, Pheucticus melanocephalus
 Blue grosbeak, Passerina caerulea
 Lazuli bunting, Passerina amoena
 Indigo bunting, Passerina cyanea
 Varied bunting, Passerina versicolor (*)
 Painted bunting, Passerina ciris
 Dickcissel, Spiza americana

References

See also
 List of birds of Channel Islands National Park
 List of birds of Yosemite National Park
 List of birds
 Lists of birds by region

Birds
California
 California
 California